Adeyemi Abayomi Isaac (21 April 1947 – 2021) was a Nigerian boxer. He competed in the men's lightweight division at the 1972 Summer Olympics.

References

1947 births
2021 deaths
Boxers at the 1972 Summer Olympics
Nigerian male boxers
Olympic boxers of Nigeria
Commonwealth Games medallists in boxing
Commonwealth Games gold medallists for Nigeria
Boxers at the 1970 British Commonwealth Games
Lightweight boxers
Medallists at the 1970 British Commonwealth Games